Bagalur may refer to:
Bagalur, Bangalore Urban, Karnataka, India
Bagalur, Hosur, Krishnagiri district, Tamil Nadu, India

See also
Bagalu, Iran